Nicoletti is an Italian surname derived from the Greek word Νικόλαος, meaning "victory of the people". It may refer to:

People 

Charles "Chuckie" Nicoletti (1916–1977), American hitman
Cynthia Nicoletti, American legal historian
Chris Nicoletti, former acoustic guitarist and backing vocalist of acoustic/electric rock band Granian
Dario Nicoletti (born 1967), Italian former cyclist
Davide Nicoletti, American ice hockey player and alternate captain during 2009–10 Alabama–Huntsville Chargers ice hockey season
Filippo Nicoletti, Italian criminal and one of the Mazzarino Friars
Giuseppe Di Vittorio, pseudonym Nicoletti (1892–1957), Italian syndicalist
Ildo Nicoletti, Italian physician who co-developed the Nicoletti assay
Joe Nicoletti, American politician
Major Nicoletti, Italo-Brazilian revolutionary
Julaika Nicoletti (born 1988), Italian female shot putter
Manfredi Nicoletti (1930–2017), Italian architect
Manuel Nicoletti (born 1998), Italian footballer 
Michele Nicoletti (born 1956), Italian politician and philosopher
Onorato Nicoletti (1872–1929), Italian mathematician
Rudy Nicoletti (born Rodolfo Nicoletti, 1976), electronic music producer and dj
Susi Nicoletti (1918–2005), German-Dutch actress
Walter Nicoletti (1952–2019), Italian professional football coach
 Loris Nicoletti (1991), Luxembourg Diplomat

Other 

Lago Nicoletti, a lake in the Province of Enna, Sicily, Italy
Nicoletti assay, a method in cell biology named after Italian physician Ildo Nicoletti

Italian-language surnames
Patronymic surnames
Surnames from given names